The 1931 Cal Aggies football team represented the Northern Branch of the College of Agriculture—now known as the University of California, Davis—as a member of the Far Western Conference (FWC) during the 1931 college football season. Led by fourth-year head coach Crip Toomey, the Aggies compiled an overall record of 4–2–2 with a mark of 2–1–2 in conference play, placing in a four-way tie for first in the FWC. No champion was named for the 1931 season. The team outscored its opponents 92 to 75 for the season. The Cal Aggies played home games at Sacramento Stadium in Sacramento, California.

Schedule

Notes

References

Cal Aggies
UC Davis Aggies football seasons
Cal Aggies football